The 2022 Pac-12 Conference men's basketball tournament was a postseason men's basketball tournament for the Pac-12 Conference held March 9–12, 2022, at T-Mobile Arena on the Las Vegas Strip in Paradise, Nevada. The tournament winner, the Arizona Wildcats, received the conference's automatic bid to the NCAA tournament.

Seeds

The bracket was set on March 5, 2022 All 12 schools were scheduled to participate in the tournament. The seedings were determined upon completion of regular season play. The winning percentage of the teams in conference play determined tournament seedings. There are tiebreakers in place to seed teams with identical conference records. The top four teams receive a bye to the quarterfinals.  Tie-breaking procedures for determining all tournament seeding is:
For two-team tie
1. Results of head-to-head competition during the regular season.

2. Each team's record (won-lost percentage) vs. the team occupying the highest position in the final regular standings, and then continuing down through the standings until one team gains an advantage. When arriving at another group of tied teams while comparing records, use each team's record (won-lost percentage) against the collective tied teams as a group (prior to that group's own tie-breaking procedure), rather than the performance against individual tied teams.

3. Won-lost percentage against all Division I opponents.

4. Coin toss conducted by the Commissioner or designee.

For multiple-team tie
1. Results (won-lost percentage) of collective head-to-head competition during the regular season among the tied teams.

2. If more than two teams are still tied, each of the tied team's record (won-lost percentage) vs. the team occupying the highest position in the final regular season standings, and then continuing down through the standings, eliminating teams with inferior records, until one team gains an advantage.

When arriving at another group of tied teams while comparing records, use each team's record (won-lost percentage) against the collective tied teams as a group (prior to that group's own tie-breaking procedure), rather than the performance against individual tied teams.

After one team has an advantage and is seeded, all remaining teams in the multiple-team tie-breaker will repeat the multiple-team tie-breaking procedure.

If at any point the multiple-team tie is reduced to two teams, the two-team tie-breaking procedure will be applied.

3. Won-lost percentage against all Division I opponents.

4. Coin toss conducted by the Commissioner or designee.

Schedule

Bracket
* denotes overtime period

Game statistics

First round

Quarterfinals

Semifinals

Championship

Awards and honors

Hall of Honor 
The 2022 class of the Pac-12 Hall of Honor will be honored on March 11 during a ceremony prior to the tournament semifinals. Following a hiatus in 2021 due to the COVID-19 pandemic, the 2022 class will return to the original format of recognizing one member as a new inductee to the Hall of Honor from each Pac-12 university. The 2022 class includes: 

 Tanya Hughes (Arizona Women's Track & Field)
 Curley Culp (Arizona State Football & Men's Wrestling)
 Layshia Clarendon (California Women's Basketball)
 Jenny Simpson (Colorado Women's Cross Country and Track & Field)
 English Gardner (Oregon Women's Track & Field)
 Steven Jackson (Oregon State Football)
 Tony Azevedo (Stanford Men's Water Polo)
 Jackie Joyner-Kersee (UCLA Women's Basketball and Track & Field)
 John Naber (USC Men's Swimming)
 Tom Chambers (Utah Men's Basketball)
 Tina Frimpong Ellertson (Washington Women's Soccer)
 Drew Bledsoe (Washington State Football).

Team and tournament leaders

All-Tournament Team

Most Outstanding Player

Tournament notes

At the start of the tournament, No. 2 Arizona, No. 13 UCLA, and No. 21 USC were ranked in the top 25.
Three teams were extended invitations to the 2022 NCAA tournament: Arizona, UCLA & USC.
Three teams were extended invitations to the 2022 National Invitation Tournament: Colorado, Oregon & Washington State.

See also

2022 Pac-12 Conference women's basketball tournament

References

Pac-12 Conference men's basketball tournament
Tournament
Basketball competitions in the Las Vegas Valley
College basketball tournaments in Nevada
Pac-12 Conference men's basketball tournament
Pac-12 Conference men's basketball tournament
College sports tournaments in Nevada